Lake Tilden, also considered part of nearby Black Lake, is a natural freshwater lake on the west side of Orlando, Florida, in Orange County, Florida. This lake, with some swampy shores, meets Black Lake on its northwest side. To the south side of the lake is Florida State Road 429, a toll highway. Residential housing developments are on the southwest and north sides of the lake. The entire lake is surrounded by private property, so there is no public access to this lake.

Water Quality

The water quality in Lake Tilden is very stable. Dating back to September 1, 1971, there have been approximately 7,082 water samples collected from Lake Tilden with samples ranging on a scale from 0 (highest quality) to 100 (lowest quality). The current water quality of Lake Tilden is 54 and has ranged from 38 to 65 since the first sample was collected in 1971. The limiting nutrient in Lake Tilden is phosphorus. The lake contains nitrogen, another nutrient required by plant life, and chlorophyll, which is a measure of algae abundance.

Wildlife 

Lake Tilden is home to many of Central Florida's native species that resides in and around the shores of lakes. One of the most common species found in Lake Tilden is the Largemouth Bass, a common freshwater sport fishing species. Residents of the area rave about the tremendous fishing the lake has when it comes to Catfish, Tilapia, and Bass. 

Size

Comparative to Lakes in the area Lake Tilden is quite small with only having a surface area of about 40 acres. The lakes average depth is 10ft but its deepest point is 36ft down. This depth allows for many different species of wildlife and vegetation to strive in Lake Tilden.

Location 

Lake Tilden is located at 28.5199° N, 81.5932° W, it is approximately 12 miles west-southwest of downtown Orlando.The area that surrounds Lake Tilden is very industrialized with many neighborhoods and shopping centers surrounding the area. Winter Garden Regional shopping center as well as Winter Garden Regal are two huge shopping centers that are within 2.5 miles of Lake Tilden. As well as shopping centers, Windsor Park Golf Club is within 2 miles of the lake. These developments raise concern for the future of the water quality in Lake Tilden due to the massive amounts of pesticides that golf courses use to fertilize the land as well as the pollution that comes from massive shopping malls. The water quality in Lake Tilden, as mentioned above, is very good, so we can hope that the risk of pollution is low.

References

Lakes of Orange County, Florida